Marsh Creek State Historic Park is a California state park in east Contra Costa County, California, United States. It was named as the newest California State Park on January 27, 2012.

The park is named for California pioneer John Marsh (1799–1856), who was a doctor, rancher, landowner and the first non-Hispanic European to settle in what is now Contra Costa County, California. Marsh was the first medical doctor in California, the first Harvard graduate in the territory, the first to introduce a number of new crops, and one of the most influential men in the establishment of California statehood.

Marsh, a widower, was a native of Massachusetts, who had previously lived in Minnesota, Illinois, Wisconsin, Missouri and New Mexico before settling in Los Angeles, California. In 1838, he acquired Rancho Los Meganos in northern California. The park covers a portion of this former rancho. Marsh reportedly paid $300 in cowhides for the land. The John Marsh House was added to the National Register of Historic Places (Reference Number 71000136) under Criteria A, B and C on October 7, 1971.

The park is significant for many reasons.  It represents the Mexican period in California history, it was an important site for the Miwok and other Native American people, it was home of the vaqueros, it was the end point of the California Trail (the first party over the Sierra Nevada came directly to the John Marsh rancho at his invitation), and its archaeological site has produced artifacts going back 7,000 years.  It has been identified by the Sacramento Archaeological Society as being the most important archaeological site in the California State Park system.

History
Archaeologists have found that Native Americans lived in the East Contra Costa County area at least 7,000 years ago. Some of the groups identified with the area are the Volvone and the Miwoks. Excavations have turned up human remains and other historical items that confirm this. Some burial sites have been identified. The park planners intend to protect these cultural sites that lie within the park boundaries.

State Park Senior Archaeologist Rick Fitzgerald led a group of Sacramento archaeologists on a tour of a Marsh Creek archaeology site on April 10, 2010.  According to the Marsh Creek State Park General Plan and Program Environmental Impact Report, "The archaeological resources at Marsh Creek State Park are some of the most unique and important within the California State Park System. Research has indicated that the first inhabitants occupied the area by at least 7,000 years ago. At about 4,000 years ago the Windmiller culture made its first appearance at Marsh Creek. The Windmiller people represent one of the most sophisticated and advanced pre-historic cultures of
aboriginal California. They lived up and down the Central Valley, with their heartland being the Delta region. These findings are important because they shed light on a rare and unique manifestation of a pre-historic
culture in California seldom seen in the archaeological record. Statewide, less than ten Windmiller sites have been identified and fewer have been excavated. The Windmiller occupation eventually gave way to what is
called the Meganos people, who carried on the Windmiller culture until about 1,000 years ago. Evidence of these people also exists at the Park."

A highlight of the park is the home of John Marsh, which was begun in 1853 and completed in 1856, and which has been undergoing extensive renovation for several years. Marsh was the first non-Hispanic white settler to live in the county. The property encompassed by Marsh Creek State Park was part of Rancho Los Meganos, (Los Meganos is a Spanish phrase meaning "sand dunes"), which Marsh acquired in 1838. Initially, Marsh lived in a four-room adobe house which had been built on the property for him by local Miwok Indians. Marsh apparently got along well with the Miwoks and had even provided them with free medical care. In return, the tribesmen built the adobe house.  After he married Abby Tuck in 1851, he retained San Francisco architect Thomas Boyd to design a grand new mansion. Many of the features apparently were stipulated by Marsh himself.  John's wife, Abby, had selected the site for the house along Marsh Creek. The new Gothic Revival style house was three stories high and had an observation tower that rose  into the air. Marsh built the tower so that he could see the approach of strangers from a great distance. Rustlers and marauders frequently came to his ranch to steal cattle or steal other valuables.  However, the stone tower proved vulnerable to earthquakes. The original tower collapsed during the 1868 Hayward earthquake. It was rebuilt with wood, but the replacement collapsed again after the 1906 quake. Images from the Historical American Building Survey (HABS) collection in the Library of Congress shown here depict the differences in the two structures. This house is the earliest substantial building in Contra Costa County that was not built entirely of adobe.

The Marsh mansion soon became known as the "Stone House" because the walls were covered with locally quarried sandstone. Abby died in 1855, before the house was finished. It was still not quite complete when John moved from the adobe house into one of the upstairs bedrooms in the new house about September 1, 1856. John was murdered while returning from a trip to Martinez, California on September 24, 1856. Alice was the daughter of John and Abby. Charles was John's son by John's first marriage.

Neither Charles nor Alice lived in the house after the parents died; the building began to suffer from neglect. A series of tenant farmers occupied the house. Reportedly, one occupant complained in 1878 that the house was in bad shape. The ranch was bought by the Balfour-Guthrie Company. The Cowell Company subsequently acquired the house and land. Neither company had any particular use for the house and spent little on maintenance. The south wall collapsed more than 20 years ago, and a part of the west wall collapsed more recently. Cracks suggested that the north wall could fall soon, and that stabilization of the house was a priority, if the house were to be saved. The roof also needed to be replaced. In 1960, Henry Cowell donated the house to Contra Costa County. In 1979, ownership passed to the California State Parks Department.

Nearly $1 million has been spent to stabilize the house since 2006. This work was required to keep the sandstone structure from collapsing.

Description of Marsh House
The roof has four large dormers, so that the third story is full height. Full-length French windows allow access from the portico to each room on the first and second floors. The house has an exterior wall covered with buff-colored sandstone. Inside the stone there was a  void, then another wall built of adobe brick. The first floor contained a stair hall that ran from the front door to the rear door, a parlor, dining room, office and kitchen. The second level has the master bedroom located directly above the parlor and accesses to the top level of the portico. There are two other bedrooms and a bath on the second level that access the stair hall. Another stairway leads to the third level, which contains three more rooms. A ladder leads from the third floor hall to the tower parapet.

Development plans

Creation of a visitor center, trailheads, picnic areas, parking, equestrian facilities, campsites and accommodations for special events, such as a farmers market, are all under consideration for future development. Restoration of the Stone House may occur, possibly funded by the California Cultural Historic Endowment and donations from the John Marsh Historic Trust. Construction of a replica of Marsh's original four-room adobe house is also under consideration. The park land contains some historic Native American burial sites. Larry Myers, a representative of the California Native American Heritage Commission, urged state park officials to keep the burial sites off-limits to the public.

See also

John Marsh (pioneer)
List of ranchos of California
Ranchos of California

Notes

References

External links
 Marsh Creek State Park General Plan and Program Environmental Impact Report. California Department of Parks and Recreation and City of Brentwood. January 2012.
 John Marsh Trust
  Mero, William. "Love, Life and Death on the California Frontier: A Woman's Life in Old Contra Costa.

State parks of California
Parks in Contra Costa County, California
Brentwood, California
History of Contra Costa County, California
Protected areas established in 2012
2012 establishments in California
Pre-statehood history of California
Regional parks in California